Yu Jingyao (born 13 February 1999) is a Chinese swimmer. She competed in the women's 200 metre breaststroke event at the 2016 Summer Olympics.

References

External links
 

1999 births
Living people
Olympic swimmers of China
Swimmers at the 2016 Summer Olympics
Asian Games medalists in swimming
Asian Games silver medalists for China
Swimmers at the 2018 Asian Games
Medalists at the 2018 Asian Games
Chinese female breaststroke swimmers
Swimmers at the 2020 Summer Olympics
21st-century Chinese women